Warriors of Releyne is a 1992 strategy video game, developed and published by Impressions Games for the Amiga and Atari ST.

Gameplay
Warriors of Releyne has the player control a party of heroes in the land of Dharak taking on orcs, trolls, and goblins led by an evil leader.

Development
Warriors of Releyne was developed and published by Impressions Games for the Amiga and Atari ST. It was released in May 1992.

Reception

Warriors of Releyne received mediocre to poor reviews from critics.

References

External links
Editing Warriors of Releyne  at Lemon Amiga
Editing Warriors of Releyne  at Atari Mania

1992 video games
Amiga games
Atari ST games
Fantasy video games
Real-time strategy video games
Video games developed in the United Kingdom
Single-player video games
Impressions Games games